Leonid Schneider (born 1977) is a Ukrainian-German science journalist and molecular cell biologist. He is known for his blog For Better Science that covers research integrity and ethics.

Career
Schneider was born to a Jewish family in Zhytomyr, Ukraine, and moved to Germany to attend university. He earned an MSc in biology at the University of Cologne in 2003 and a PhD in biology at the University of Düsseldorf in 2008, with the dissertation  Role of the mitotic spindle associated protein TACC3 in cell proliferation and survival. He was a doctoral candidate at the university clinic in Cologne 2003–2007 and subsequently a postdoctoral researcher at the Fondazione Istituto FIRC di Oncologia Molecolare in Milan 2008–2012, the Technische Universität Darmstadt 2012–2013 and the Max Planck Institute for Polymer Research 2014–2015. His research has focused on molecular cell biology, stem cells and cancer research.

Since 2015 he has worked as a freelance science journalist and cartoonist, and he has become known for his blog For Better Science that covers research integrity and ethics, especially in the biomedical sciences. In 2020 his blog published an article by Elisabeth Bik and three co-authors that revealed the existence of a Chinese "paper mill" believed to be responsible for over 1,300 fraudulent papers by Chinese authors.

Legal problems
Schneider has occasionally been sued over his blog posts; for example by a German scientist couple, in connection with the scandal around Paolo Macchiarini. More recently, he has been involved in legal disputes brought by Didier Raoult and Jan van Deursen.

References

External links 
 Official website

German molecular biologists
Cell biologists
1977 births
Living people
Science journalists